Centrum-West is a RandstadRail station in Zoetermeer, the Netherlands.

History
The station opened, as a railway station, on 22 May 1977 as part of the Zoetermeerlijn, operating Zoetermeer Stadslijn services. The train station closed on 3 June 2006 and reopened as a RandstadRail station on 29 October 2006 for the HTM tram services (4), and on 20 October 2007 for tram service 3.

The station features 3 platforms, these platforms are low, and the same level as the tram doors. The terminating platform is for RR3 services starting at Centrum-West and then stopping at Dorp, Delftsewallen etc. The two through tracks are: Westbound - towards Voorweg and Den Haag, and the Eastbound platform for services to Zoetermeer Javalaan and the Stadslijn. These services call at Stadhuis and Palenstein etc. These two tracks are for RR3 and RR4 services.

Passengers from Den Haag can change at this station for Dorp, Delftsewallen and Driemanspolder and Vice Versa, to get there quicker.

Train services
The following services currently call at Centrum-West:

RR3 starts at Centrum-West, operates around the Zoetermeer Circuit, then passes Centrum-West again and finally continues to Den Haag.

Bus services
A bus station is next to the station (connected by the footbridge). The following services serve the bus station:

 32 (Centrum-West - Stompwijk - Zoeterwoude-Dorp - Leiden Lammenschans - Leiden Cenraal - Katwijk aan Zee) - Connexxion)
 50 (Centrum-West - Driemanspolder RR - Rijswijk NS) - Veolia
 54 (Centrum-West - Driemanspolder RR - Den Haag HS/Hoge School) - Veolia
 70 (Centrum-West - Zoetermeer Hospital - Zoetermeer Noordhove - Zoetermeer Hospital - Centrum-West) - Veolia
 71 (Centrum-West - Zoetermeer NS - Zoetermeer Rokkeveen West - Zoetermeer Rokkeveen Oost - Zoetermeer Oost NS - Centrum-West) - Veolia
 72 (Centrum-West - Zoetermeer Oost NS - Zoetermeer Rokkeveen Oost - Zoetermeer Rokkeveen Oost - Zoetermeer NS - Centrum-West) - Veolia
 74 (Centrum-West - Zoetermeer Oost NS - Zoetermeer Lansinghage - Centrum-West) - Veolia
 77 (Centrum-West - Voorweg RR - Meerzicht RR - Driemanspolder RR - Dorp RR - Zoetermeer Hoornerhage - Zoetermeer Oosterheem) - Veolia
 121 (Centrum-West - Zoetermeer NS - Pijnacker Centrum - Delft University - Delft NS) - Veolia
 165 (Centrum-West - Palenstein RR - Willem Dreeslaan RR - Benthuizen - Hazerwoude - Hazerwoude Rijndijk - Alphen a/d Rijn NS) - Connexxion
 170 (Centrum-West - Delftsewallen RR - Zoetermeer Oost NS - Zoetermeer NS - Berkel - Rotterdam Noord NS - Rotterdam Centraal NS) - Qbuzz
 173 (Centrum-West - Zoetermeer Hoornerhage - Bleiswijk - Bergschenhoek - Rotterdam Noord NS - Rotterdam Centraal NS) - Qbuzz
 177 (Centrum-West - Zoetermeer Hoornerhage - Moerkapelle - Waddinxveen South - Gouda NS) - Connexxion
 204 (Centrum-West - Zoetermeer NS - Zoetermeer Oost NS - Lansinghage - Bergschenhoek - Rotterdam Centraal NS) - Qbuzz (Fastbus)
 206 (Centrum-West - Zoeterwoude-Dorp - Leiden Lammenschans - Leiden Centraal) - Connexxion

Gallery

Railway stations opened in 1977
RandstadRail stations in Zoetermeer